Tranquilli is a surname. Notable people with the surname include:

 Allison Tranquilli (born 1972) Australian basketballer
 Andrea Tranquilli (born 1986), Italian rower
 Andrew Tranquilli (born 1972), Australian rules footballer
 Silvano Tranquilli (1925–1997), Italian actor

See also
 Ignazio Silone (1900–1978), Italian novelist born Secondino Tranquilli

Italian-language surnames